Gord MacFarlane (born January 1, 1956) is a Canadian retired ice hockey player.

Amateur career
MacFarlane attended St. Andrew's College, Aurora and the University of Vermont.

Professional career
MacFarlane was a prospect of the Philadelphia Flyers.

MacFarlane began his career with the Grand Rapids Owls and finished his career with the Toledo Goaldiggers. In total, MacFarlane played 226 regular season games in the International Hockey League (1945–2001).

References

External links

1956 births
Living people
Sportspeople from Aurora, Ontario
Ice hockey people from Ontario
University of Vermont alumni
Grand Rapids Owls players
Toledo Goaldiggers players
Vermont Catamounts men's ice hockey players
Canadian ice hockey centres